Zhang Mo is the name of:

Zhang Mo (actor) (born 1982), Chinese actor
Zhang Mo (director) (born 1983), Chinese filmmaker
Zhang Mo (table tennis) (born 1989), Chinese-born Canadian table tennis player